Star Worms is a 2012 Russian comedy film directed by Andrey Kagadeev and Nikolay Kopeykin of experimental rock band N.O.M.

Plot 
The film tells about a professor who works in the scientific town of Ishtym in Siberia and studies the Universe. Suddenly in 2221 he made a discovery that changed all ideas about the structure of the universe. Envious colleagues did not like this, but there were those who decided to help the professor build the first new type of interplanetary ship in history so that the professor could prove his theory.

Cast 
 Andrey Kagadeev as Professor Chasharskiy / Obezyanoid
 Nikolay Kopeykin as German Borisovich Ryap / Obezyanoid
 Siarhei Mikhalok as Bogdan Sherstyuk (as Sergei Mikhalok)
 Roman Maksimov as Fyodor Zhishinnikov
 Svetlana Gumanovskaya
 Sergey Shnurov
 Prokhor Alekseev as Irshat Lodzhiev (Khavron)
 Aleksandr Laertskiy as Yuliy Gogarin (Yuri Gagarin)
 Yuliya Vorobyova as Nykholay / Robot / Ishtym Market Sellers and Customers / Obezyanoid
 Viktoriya Leskova as Nykholay / Obezyanoid / The Werewolf Clown

References

External links 
 

2012 films
2010s Russian-language films
Russian science fiction comedy films
2010s science fiction comedy films